Sasan Ansari (born 4 May 1991) is an Iranian footballer who plays for Foolad as a forward.

Club career

Foolad
Ansari started his career with Foolad in his teenage years. Later, he was placed on the first team by Majid Jalali.

Club career statistics

 Assists

Honours

Club
Foolad 
Persian Gulf Pro League (1): 2013–14
Hazfi Cup (1): 2020–21 
Iranian Super Cup: 2021

Tractor
Hazfi Cup (1): 2019–20

Individual
Persian Gulf Pro League Team of the Season (1) : 2016-17

References

External links

1991 births
Living people
Iranian footballers
Persian Gulf Pro League players
Foolad FC players
Persepolis F.C. players
Sepahan S.C. footballers
Tractor S.C. players
Sportspeople from Fars province
Association football forwards